Ottavio Acquaviva d'Aragona may refer to:
Ottavio Acquaviva d'Aragona (iuniore) (1609–1674), Italian Roman Catholic cardinal
Ottavio Acquaviva d'Aragona (seniore) (1560–1624), Italian Roman Catholic cardinal